ASTM D8441 is an ASTM International standard defining the International Intoxicating Cannabinoid Product Symbol (IICPS). As of mid-2022, the symbol has been incorporated into the universal symbols required for cannabis packages in the states of Montana, New Jersey, and Vermont.

Development 

The IICPS was co-designed by Doctors for Cannabis Regulation (DFCR) founder David L. Nathan and University of Pennsylvania design student Eli Nathan. Nathan has published a number of standards for cannabis product labeling, one of which was modified and renamed the IICPS in 2021.

Working together with DFCR, Committee D37 of ASTM International approved the IICPS as the world's first and only cannabis product symbol to bear the designation of an international voluntary consensus standard. The standard was published as ASTM D8441/D8441M in February 2022.

Definition 

ASTM D8441/D8441M defines the IICPS as the silhouette of a cannabis leaf inside an ANSI Z535 and ISO 3864 compliant black-bordered yellow warning triangle. All dimensions of the symbol and the leaf silhouette (a novel design by David and Eli Nathan) are defined in ASTM D8441/D8441M. The state of Vermont approved use of the IICPS before the ASTM standard was published, and their choice of a different color scheme is now out of compliance with the ASTM D8441/D8441M standard.

When used on a dark background, the IICPS utilizes a yellow border that is defined in ASTM D8441/D8441M but is not included in ISO 3864.

As required by ISO 3864 and ISO 7010, no text is permitted in the IICPS itself. However, the IICPS is designed to be accompanied by supplemental text if and when defined by the authority having jurisdiction (AHJ). For example, the Montana symbol includes the word “MARIJUANA” under the IICPS, the New Jersey symbol includes another graphic with a hand in a stop sign and the words “NOT SAFE FOR KIDS”, and the Vermont symbol includes the text “CONTAINS THC”.

Usage 

Montana was the first U.S. state to adopt the IICPS in late 2021. New Jersey and Vermont have subsequently incorporated the IICPS design into their state symbols.

New Jersey and Vermont have mandated the printing or embossing of the IICPS directly onto single servings of cannabis products — such as edibles.

Accessing the IICPS and ASTM D8441/D8441M 

While the standard ASTM D8441/D8441M is only available for purchase directly from ASTM International, the digital files for the IICPS itself is available at no cost via download on the DFCR website, and there is no fee for its use by regulatory authorities. States that have adopted the symbol have made it freely available for download on the websites of their respective cannabis regulatory authorities.

References 

Cannabis
ASTM standards